This is a list of years in Mauritania.

20th century

21st century

See also
 History of Mauritania
 Timeline of Nouakchott

 
Mauritania history-related lists
Mauritania
years